is a Japanese light novel series written by Hiromu and illustrated by raemz. Shogakukan published the first volume under its Gagaga Bunko imprint in June 2019. A manga adaptation with illustrations by Bobcat began serialization in Square Enix's Manga UP! in April 2020.

Media

Light novels
The series is written by Hiromu and illustrated by raemz; its first volume was published by Shogakukan under its Gagaga Bunko imprint on June 18, 2019. As of August 2022, seven volumes and one short stories volume have been released.

In July 2021, Yen Press announced that they had licensed the series for English publication.

In 2022, the government of Fukui budgeted 6 million yen for a pop-culture tourism campaign collaboration with Chitose Is in the Ramune Bottle.

Volume list

Manga
A manga adaptation, illustrated by Bobcat, began serialization in Square Enix's Manga UP! website on April 12, 2020. As of November 2022, the individual chapters have been collected into five tankōbon volumes.

At Anime NYC 2021, Yen Press announced they would also publish the manga adaptation in English.

Volume list

Reception
In the Kono Light Novel ga Sugoi! guidebook, the series ranked first in the bunkobon category in 2021 and 2022. The series has over 280,000 copies in circulation.

References

External links
 Light novel official website at Gagaga Bunko 
 Manga official website at Square Enix 
 

2019 Japanese novels
Anime and manga based on light novels
Gagaga Bunko
Gangan Comics manga
Japanese webcomics
Light novels
Romantic comedy anime and manga
Shōnen manga
Webcomics in print
Yen Press titles